Bledi Muca is a Greek professional footballer who plays for Anthoupoli Larissa as an attacking midfielder..

Career
He was born in Albania on 6 January 1988 to Albanian ethnic parents. He migrated with his family to Greece in the early 1990s. He started his career as an amateur playing in local Larissa's region teams such as Pinios, Pirgetos and Ampeloniakos. In 2011, he became professional and played in the third national division (Gamma Ethniki) with Oikonomos FC, gaining the attention of major Greek teams. Finally, on 3 January 2012, he signed a 3.5 years contract with  AEL. On 1 February 2015, he solved his contract with AEL and signed with Serres

References

External links

1988 births
Greek footballers
Greek people of Albanian descent
Athlitiki Enosi Larissa F.C. players
Luftëtari Gjirokastër players
Anthoupoli Larissa F.C. players
Living people
Association football midfielders
Footballers from Larissa
Greek expatriate sportspeople in Albania
Greek expatriate footballers
Expatriate footballers in Albania